Rosa (26 May 2001 – 14 July 2020) was a Spanish-born Landes cow known for her participation in the French game show Intervilles. She became a popular part of the programme due to her intelligence and aggressiveness. She died in 2020 after suffering from a gastric illness.

Early life 
Rosa was born in Badajoz, Extremadura, Spain.  She was born distinctive from the other black cows by having a black face and white body. A year after her birth, she joined the breeding herd of the Labat family in France where she grew up after being spotted by Jean-Pierre Labat whilst on a visit for breeding cattle. The Labat family historically provided cows for use in Intervilles. She was given a trial in Germany for Intervilles. Despite initially appearing shy in the trial, the programme's producer Yves Launoy selected Rosa for the televised programme due to her unique skin colours despite Jean-Pierre Labat arguing that there were better cows.

Intervilles 
Rosa made her debut on Intervilles in 2004. During her time in the games, she was recognised for her aggression towards contestants but also her intelligence in needing to knock down sets and prevent contestants from scoring. Despite her aggressiveness, she would not attack contestants when they were on the ground. When it came to a game around pushing contestants into a pool, she would approach them slowly without aggression running her horns against the legs of contestants to see if they would dive or not. Due to her popularity, she was given her own game called "Rosa Strike" based upon bowling. She only missed one season of Intervilles when she gave birth to a calf. Due to her popularity, she was featured in the Intervilles video game for the Nintendo Wii. Even after Intervilles finished, fans of the programme would visit the Labat farm in order to see Rosa.

Farm life and death 
Following her retirement from televised competition, Rosa adopted a role as head of the herd at the Labat family farm, often leading the other cows. She continued to tour France taking part in similar style games to Intervilles until 2020 when she was retired to pasture. Later in 2020, she started losing weight and she died of a gastric illness on 14 July 2020.

References 

Individual cows
Deaths in France
French television personalities
2001 animal births
2020 animal deaths
Individual animals in France
Individual animals in Spain
Individual animals in sport